Madhanamala is a 1947 Tamil language film starring Sriram, T. R. Rajani, P. B. Rangachari, Vidwan Srinivasan, P. S. Veerappa, R. N. Nambiar, S. R. Janaki, T. S. Jaya, V. Rajalakshmi and V. Kumar. The film was directed by K. Vembu and produced by S. Soundararajan of Tamil Nadu Talkies.

Plot 
The story revolves around Vikraman, a young man who asks for the celebrated court dancer Madhanamala during celebrations organised by a king who offers a gift to all those present. As a result, the king gets angry and banishes Vikraman from the kingdom. Vikraman, however, still manages to find Madhanamala and they both fall in love. Disguised as a sadhu, Vikraman meets Madhanamala and they spend a night together. Soon, though, Vikraman gets caught. In the end, after some tribulations, Vikraman is reunited with Madhanamala.

Cast 

 Sriram as Vikraman
 T. R. Rajanias Madhanamala
 P. B. Rangachari as the fake sadhu
 Vidwan Srinivasan as the poet
 P. S. Veerappan
 Mani as the king

Soundtrack 
M. S. Gnanamani composed the songs, for which the lyrics were written by C. S. Varadarajan.

References 

1948 films
1940s Tamil-language films
Indian black-and-white films
Films scored by M. S. Gnanamani